This is a list of accredited public and private non-profit universities according to the data of the Ministry of Higher Education and Scientific Research and the National Center for Quality Assurance and Accreditation of Educational and Training Institutions in the State of Libya. .

Accredited And Recognized Public Universities 

Academy of Graduate Studies 
Al-Mergib University 
University of Al-Jabal Al Gharbi
Al Zawiya University  
 Azzaytuna University   
Misrata University
Sabratha University    
Omar Al-Mukhtar University 
The Islamic University of Asaied Mohamed Bin Ali Al Sanussi 
Open University of Libya
Sabha University   
University of Benghazi
 College of Electrical and Electronics Technology (CEET), Benghazi 
University of Tripoli
University of Derna
University of Sirte
University of Aljufra
University of Fezzan
University of Tobruk
University of Bani Walid
University of Aljafara
University of Nalut
University of Al-Zintan
University of Bright Star
University of Ajdabiya
Asmarya University for the Islamic Sciences
Al-Arab Medical University
Gulf of Sidra University
Wadi Alshatti University

Accredited Private Not-For-Profit Universities 

Al Rifaq University for Humanitarian and Applied Science - Tripoli City
Libyan University for Humanitarian and Applied Science - Tajora City
Africa University for Humanitarian and Applied Science - Tripoli City
Attahadi Medical Al-Ahlia University (Attahadi University) - Tripoli City
Faculty of Dentistry Khalij Libya - Janzour City
Al-Hadera University for Humanities and Applied Sciences - Tripoli City
Al-Mawakeb International College for Humanities and Applied Sciences - Tripoli City
University of Tripoli Al-Ahlia - Janzour City
Libyan International Medical University - Benghazi City
Benghazi Al-Ahlia University - Benghazi City
Berenice University of Architecture and Urbanism - Benghazi City
Al-Furat Al-Ahlia University - Ajdabiya City
Mediterranean University - Benghazi City 
Benghazi Modern University - Benghazi City
University of Al-Awael - Ajdabiya City
University of Al-Awael - Tobruk City Branch
British Libyan University - Benghazi City
Assalam International University - Benghazi City
Modern American University - Benghazi City
Al-Assema Private University - Tripoli City

References

External links
Universities in Libya
List of Government Universities at the Libyan Centre for Quality Assurance and Accreditation (in Arabic)

Libya
Universities
Libya